Killiney Church is an ancient church in County Dublin, Ireland.

Location

In the modern day, this site is in the middle of housing developments, near Marino Avenue West.

The building

A monastery stood on the site from the 6th–7th century. The name of the 6th century site was Cill Ingean Léinín ("Church of the Daughters of Léinín"). These were seven virgin sisters, Aiglenn, Macha, Luiden, Druiden, Luicill, Bimtach, and Briga; the last is also patron of Tully Church. Their brother was Colmán of Cloyne (Colmán mac Léníne; 530–606). Their festival was celebrated on 6 March.

The church was built in the 11th century.

References

Religion in County Dublin
Archaeological sites in County Dublin
National Monuments in County Dublin
Killiney
Churches in Dún Laoghaire–Rathdown